Namhaedo or Namhae Island is the principal island of Namhae County, on the southern coast of South Gyeongsang Province, South Korea. It is the fifth largest island in South Korea. Together with Changseon Island, it forms Namhae County. It is joined to land by Namhae Bridge.

History 
Namhaedo Island is the location of Yi Sun-sin's death on the 16th of December, 1598.

Chen Lin and Yi Sunsin together helped defeat the Japanese at the Battle of Noryang, ending the Imjin war.

See also 

 Battle of Noryang
 Yi Sun-sin
 Chen Lin (Ming dynasty)

References

Islands of South Gyeongsang Province
Namhae County